Rhynchosia latifolia, commonly called prairie snoutbean, is a species of plant in the legume family that is native to south-central United States.

It is a perennial that produces yellow flowers in the summer.

References

latifolia
Flora of North America